Nidularium picinguabense is a plant species in the genus Nidularium. This species is endemic to Brazil.

References

picinguabense
Flora of Brazil